T. J. Alldridge (1847–1916) was the first district commissioner of Sierra Leone. He traveled extensively throughout the country and his photographs are among the first to be taken of the interior regions. In 1900 the Royal Geographical Society honored him for his contributions to ethnography.

References

Sierra Leonean politicians
1847 births
1916 deaths
Place of birth missing